Hypercompe flavopunctata is a moth of the family Erebidae first described by William Schaus in 1921. It is found in Paraguay.

References

Hypercompe
Moths described in 1921